Alberto Aguilera y Velasco (May 7, 1842 – December 25, 1913) was a Spanish politician and lawyer.

He was Minister of Interior of Spain during the regency of Maria Christina of Austria and mayor of Madrid on several occasions between 1901 and 1910.

He was originally a member of the Liberal Party and was chosen deputy in Congress by the district of Granada Province in the successive elections celebrated between 1886 and 1903.

He was Spain's  Minister of the Interior between March 12 and November 4, 1894, in a government presided over by Práxedes Mateo Sagasta.

Mayor  

As mayor of the capital of Spain he was involved in numerous important events and left an impression. Soon after becoming mayor, he organised the inauguration of the throne of Alfonso XIII of Spain, carried out on June 5, 1902. Monuments dedicated to historical people were erected including Héroe de Cascorro, Juan Bravo Murillo and Lope de Vega.

Later in 1902, Aguilera opened the Hospital de San Pedro de los Naturales and worked with architects such as Jose Lopez Sallaberry and Francisco Andres Octavio to develop the city. In 1906 the Parque del Oeste was created and in 1908 construction began on another hospital, Hospital de Maudes.

He died in 1913.

1842 births
1913 deaths
People from Valencia
Liberal Party (Spain, 1880) politicians
Interior ministers of Spain
Members of the Congress of Deputies of the Spanish Restoration
Politicians from the Valencian Community
Mayors of Madrid
19th-century Spanish lawyers
Civil governors of Madrid
Civil governors of Toledo